Hydroxycarteolol is a beta blocker and metabolite of carteolol.

References

Beta blockers
4-Quinolones
Human drug metabolites
Quinolinols
Secondary alcohols
Tert-butyl compounds